Felix Oevermann (born 23 March 1985 in Osnabrück) is a German rower.

References 
 

1985 births
Living people
German male rowers
Sportspeople from Osnabrück
World Rowing Championships medalists for Germany
21st-century German people